The Zayed Prize may refer to:
The Zayed Future Energy Prize
The Zayed International Prize for the Environment